Cao Lang  is a former province of Vietnam.

Geography
Cao Lang province has the following geographical location:
 The North borders on the Choang ethnic autonomous region Guangxi ( China)
 The South borders on the province Ha Bac
 The East borders on the province Quang Ninh
 The West borders on the province Bac Thai and the province Ha Tuyen.

History
Cao Lang province was formed by the resolution of the National Assembly of the Democratic Republic of Vietnam on December 27-year 1975 on the basis of the merger of the two provinces Cao Bang and Lang Son.

Cao Lang province was officially incorporated from December year 1976, with a population of 871,000 people and an area of 13,781 km².

Cao Lang province consists of 2 Cao Bang town and Lang Son], the provincial capital is located in Cao Bang town, not included district Dinh Lap at that time belonged to the province Quang Ninh.

At the end of the year 1978, GDP of Cao Lang province reached 383 million VND, of which the value of agriculture-forestry output reached 120 million VND, food production reached 114 thousand tons.

In May 1977, Cao Lang Radio was started construction in Cao Bang.  On September 2-year 1977, Cao Lang Radio officially broadcast the first program, on 2 electric waves 48m and 312m, including 4 languages:  Vietnamese,  Tay –  Nung,  Mong, Dao.

Cao Lang province has 20 administrative units including: town Cao Bang (provincial capital), town Lang Son, town Tinh Tuc and 18 districts: Bac Son, Bao Lac, Binh Gia, Cao Loc, Chi Lang, Ha Quang, Hoa An, Huu Lung, Loc Binh, Nguyen Binh, Quang Hoa, Thach An, Thong Nong, Tra Linh, Trang Định, Trung Khanh, Van Lang, Van Quan.

On December 29, 1978, the 4th session of the 6th National Assembly issued a resolution to divide Cao Lang province to re-establish the province Cao Bang and the province Lang Son.  In the same year, the two districts Ngan Son, Cho Ra (now Ba Be district) of the province Bac Thai were moved to Cao Bang province to manage (from five) in the same year. 1996, these two districts returned to the province Bac Kan) and moved the district Dinh Lap of the province Quang Ninh to Lang Son province to manage:

 Cao Bang province includes Cao Bang town, Tinh Tuc town and 11 districts: Bao Lac,  Cho Ra, Ha Quang, Hoa An, Ngan Son, Nguyen Binh, Quang Hoa, Thach An, Thong Nong, Tra Linh, Trung Khanh.
 Lang Son province includes Lang Son town and 10 districts: Bac Son, Binh Gia, Cao Loc, Chi Lang, Dinh Lap, Huu Lung, Loc Binh, Trang Dinh, Van Lang, Van Quan.

References

Former provinces of Vietnam